Vepada Subba Rao, better known as Kancharapalem Raju, is an Indian actor who works in Telugu-language films. He received wide popularity for the character "Raju" in his debut film C/o Kancharapalem (2018).

Early life and career 
Subba Rao used to act in dramas. He worked at GVMC. During the casting period of C/o Kancharapalem, director Venkatesh Maha gave him a chance to act in the film. The film brought him wide acclaim and since then he continued acting in the films. He won a jury award for his work in the film C/o Kancharapalem at the Caleidoscope Indian Film Festival.

Filmography

References

External links 

 

Telugu male actors
Male actors in Telugu cinema
Male actors from Visakhapatnam
Indian male film actors
21st-century Indian male actors
People from Visakhapatnam district
Living people
Year of birth missing (living people)